Edward J McHugh (1846 – 28 August 1900), also known as Edward M'Hugh, was an Irish nationalist politician.  He was an Anti-Parnellite Irish National Federation Member of Parliament (MP) for South Armagh from 1892 until his death.

He was first elected at the 1892 general election, when he stood against the sitting Parnellite MP Alexander Blane. McHugh won a comfortable victory over the Unionist candidate, while Blane secured barely 1% of the votes. McHugh was re-elected in 1886, with a wide margin over another Unionist candidate, and held the seat until his death in August 1900. No by-election was held for his seat before Parliament was dissolved for the general election in October 1900.

References

External links 
 

1846 births
1900 deaths
Anti-Parnellite MPs
Members of the Parliament of the United Kingdom for County Armagh constituencies (1801–1922)
UK MPs 1892–1895
UK MPs 1895–1900